The 1999 Nigerian House of Representatives elections in Federal Capital Territory was held on February 20, 1999, to elect members of the House of Representatives to represent Federal Capital Territory, Nigeria.

Overview

Summary

Results

Abaji/Gwagwalada/Kwali/Kuje 
Party candidates registered with the Independent National Electoral Commission to contest in the election. PDP candidate Yusuf Baban Takwa won the election.

Amac/Bwari 
Party candidates registered with the Independent National Electoral Commission to contest in the election. PDP candidate Prince Nicholas Ukachukwu won the election.

References 

Federal Capital Territory House of Representatives elections
1999 elections in Nigeria
February 1999 events in Nigeria